Ahmet Emin Engin (born 9 August 1996) is a German professional footballer who plays as a winger for Süper Lig club Kasımpaşa.

Career
He made his 2. Bundesliga debut for MSV Duisburg on 22 August 2015 against Karlsruher SC. On 26 May 2021, it was announced that he would leave Duisburg at the end of the 2020–21 season. He moved to Kasımpaşa afterwards.

Career statistics

Personal life
Engin was born in Germany and is of Turkish descent.

References

External links

1996 births
Living people
People from Moers
Sportspeople from Düsseldorf (region)
German footballers
German people of Turkish descent
Association football midfielders
MSV Duisburg players
MSV Duisburg II players
Kasımpaşa S.K. footballers
2. Bundesliga players
3. Liga players
Süper Lig players
Footballers from North Rhine-Westphalia